Momo Car-Sharing was a car-sharing program conducted by Intelligent Energy Europe to promote alternatives to car ownership. The project name momo was taken from the phrase "more options for energy efficient mobility through car-sharing".

The project started 1 October 2008 and included 14 partners from various EU countries. The International Association of Public Transport and Bundesverband CarSharing (the German association for car-sharing) also supported the project.

The program was part of a presentation by the city of Bremen in the Urban Best Practice Area at the World Exposition EXPO 2010 in Shanghai. The momo-project was presented in workshops on the EXPO and served as a reference for the inauguration of Car-Sharing in Shanghai.

The Bremen Car-Sharing Action Plan has also received the Travel Planning Award 2010 of the German Town Planner's Association SRL.

Project objectives
Momo was designed as a component to reach the EU targets in the fields of transport, energy and the reduction of  emissions. This European project aimed at raising the efficiency and attractiveness of Car-Sharing in Europe. By building on the potential of Car-Sharing in regards to saving energy, minimising greenhouse gases and improving the quality of urban live, a significant increase of the Car-Sharing services and the Car-Sharing demand had been aimed for. To reach those goals the project partner designed a concept that included all relevant stakeholders at most. These are next to local authorities and Car-Sharing providers, public transport providers, energy agencies and research facilities.

The project expected to have the following results:
 more than 20,000 new car-sharers
 the reduction of about 58,000GJ p.a. and CO2 emissions of 6,000t p.a
 to replace 3,500 private cars and gain free space due to less parking spaces needed
 to acquire new regions where no car-share is present at the moment, with a special focus on Ireland, Finland and Greece

Notable facts
Notable facts of the momo project are:
 Project name: momo Car-Sharing, more options for energy efficient mobility through Car-Sharing
 Supported by Intelligent Energy Europe
 Lead partner: Der Senator für Umwelt, Bau, Verkehr und Europa, Bremen, Germany
 Start of the project: 1 October 2008
 Ending date: 30 September 2011
 Duration: 35 months
 Total budget: €2,693,644

Project partners were:
 Der Senator für Umwelt, Bau, Verkehr und Europa (The Senator for Environment, Building, Traffic and Europe), Bremen, Germany
 Cambio Mobilitätsservice GmbH & Co.KG, Bremen, Germany
 Bundesverband CarSharing (bcs), Hanover, Germany
 Mendes Limited, Cork, Ireland
 GoCar, Cork, Ireland
 Fundació Mobilitat Sostenible i Segura, Barcelona, Spain
 Motiva, Helsinki, Finland
 International Union for Public Transport UITP, Brussels, Belgium
 Bond Beter Leefmilieu, Brussels, Belgium
 Taxistop, Brussels, Belgium
 Institute for Environmental Policy, p.b.c., Prague, Czech Republic
 Italian Ministry of Environment, Land and Sea (IME), Rome, Italy
 Italian National Agency for New Technologies, Energy and the Environment (ENEA), Rome, Italy
 Center for Renewable Energy Sources (CRES), Athens, Greece

References 

Carsharing
European Union and the environment
Transport and the European Union
Road transport